Vergemoli was a comune (municipality) in the Province of Lucca in the Italian region Tuscany, located about  northwest of Florence and about  northwest of Lucca. On 1 January 2014 it was merged with Fabbriche di Vallico in the new comune of Fabbriche di Vergemoli.
 

 

Cities and towns in Tuscany
Fabbriche di Vergemoli
Frazioni of the Province of Lucca